The 511 Federal Building is a former federal post office that is currently known as the Arlene and Harold Schnitzer Center for Art and Design of the Pacific Northwest College of Art (PNCA) in Portland, Oregon, United States. PNCA moved into the building in February 2015, after a $32 million remodeling project.

Previous occupants of the building included the Department of Homeland Security offices for U.S. Citizenship and Immigration Services and U.S. Immigration and Customs Enforcement, as well as the Department of Agriculture.

The building was constructed in 1916–1918 and opened in 1919 after being commissioned by the Secretary of the Treasury, one of the last post offices built under the 1893 Tarsney Act, and cost $1 million. It was designed by architect Lewis P. Hobart. It is located between Portland's Old Town Chinatown and the Pearl District. It was added to the National Register of Historic Places in 1979, as the U.S. Post Office. It has a basement and sub-basement, complete with walled off shanghai tunnels.

Gallery

References

External links
 

Federal buildings in the United States
1918 establishments in Oregon
Government buildings completed in 1918
Government buildings in Portland, Oregon
Government buildings on the National Register of Historic Places in Oregon
National Register of Historic Places in Portland, Oregon
Neoclassical architecture in Oregon
Pacific Northwest College of Art
Pearl District, Portland, Oregon
Post office buildings on the National Register of Historic Places in Oregon